Virginia Cuthbert Elliot (August 27, 1908, in West Newton, Pennsylvania – January 24, 2001) was an American artist.

Life
She graduated from Syracuse University with a BFA. She studied at Chelsea College of Art and Design, the Academie de la Grande Chaumiere, and at the Academie Colarossi. She graduated from the University of Pittsburgh with an MFA in 1934. She married artist Philip C. Elliott. Both were professors at the University at Buffalo. Their papers are held at the Archives of American Art.

References

External links
Oral history interview with Virginia Cuthbert, 1995 Aug. 28
http://www.meibohmfinearts.com/artists.aspx?ID=48
http://www.thebenjamangallery.com/regionalartists.html
http://artvoice.com/issues/v7n32/virginia_cuthbert
http://newsandevents.buffalostate.edu/news/exhibition-works-virginia-cuthbert-burchfield-penney

1908 births
2001 deaths
People from West Newton, Pennsylvania
20th-century American women artists
Académie Colarossi alumni
University of Pittsburgh alumni
University at Buffalo faculty
American women academics
Syracuse University alumni
American expatriates in France